Active roster may refer to:

 Active roster (baseball), of Major League Baseball (MLB)
 Colloquially called the "25-man roster", but became 26 players as of the 2021 season
 53-man roster, of the National Football League (NFL)

See also
 Major League Baseball rosters
 Minor League Baseball rosters
 Roster (disambiguation)